The Dartmouth Big Green men's lacrosse team represents Dartmouth College in NCAA Division I men's lacrosse. Dartmouth competes as a member of the Ivy League and plays its home games at Scully-Fahey Field in Hanover, New Hampshire. Dartmouth fielded its first lacrosse team in 1926.

Tom Dent era

Head Coach Tom Dent led the team for its first 35 seasons until his retirement in 1960. Recruited to Dartmouth to coach soccer, he took on the task of coaching the first lacrosse team although he had no experience in the latter sport. Through the 1940s the Indians were considered a lacrosse "power" as they rolled up nine New England championships in 11 years. Dent's overall lacrosse record for 35 years is 188 wins, 141 losses, and 4 ties.

A successful coach in terms of winning, Coach Dent was also concerned with the characters of his charges. The Dartmouth lacrosse team bestows an annual award in Tom Dent's memory, and it is "To be awarded to the Senior player who by vote of the entire team, has demonstrated the ideals of Tom Dent through his aggressive play, his proven ability as a team player, and his enjoyment of the game, and who by his sportsmanlike conduct is a credit to the memory of Tom Dent and to Dartmouth."

1961–2014

The Big Green secured the Ivy League championship in 1964, 1965, and 2003. This was determined by the Ivy League conference records until the inception of a conference tournament in 2010.

Dartmouth named Rick Sowell as its head coach in 1999, the first African-American Head Coach in Division I lacrosse. He would lead the Big Green for the next 5 seasons, overseeing an incredible turn-around in the program's fortunes.

In 2003, the Big Green posted one of the biggest upsets in lacrosse history when unranked Dartmouth played #2 Princeton at Princeton's Class of 1952 Field on April 26. Dartmouth, having finished last in the Ivy League in 2002, played on the road versus the defending champs. Nevertheless, Dartmouth prevailed by stunning the Tigers 13-6. It was the first time Dartmouth had beaten Princeton in lacrosse since 1956. Dartmouth went on to win the Ivy League title and qualify for the NCAA tournament.

Dartmouth made its first appearance in the NCAA tournament in 2003, where it was eliminated in the first round by Syracuse, 13–11. The game was highlighted by the end-to-end game-tying goal scored by the Dartmouth goalie, Andrew Goldstein. Sowell left for St. John's University at the conclusion of the 2003 season.

Bill Wilson replaced Sowell for the 2004 season. "During his tenure with the Big Green, (Wilson) compiled a 40-44 overall record, while coaching nine first-team all-league players, one Ivy League Rookie of the Year, 18 first-team All-New England players and seven players selected in the Major League Lacrosse Draft. Signature wins for Dartmouth during Wilson's six-year stint include an upset of fourth-ranked Maryland in 2005, a pair of victories of top-10 ranked Notre Dame and a win over 10th-ranked league rival Princeton in 2008."

Andy Towers became the Big Green's 9th Head Coach in 2010. Towers had been an assistant Dartmouth coach for the preceding 5 seasons. In 2013, Dartmouth Men's lacrosse posted another stunning upset against then #9 Princeton, beating them 10-9 at Scully-Fahey field on March 13. As reported in College Crosse:

Entering that game, the Big Green were just 2-8, suffering through a six-game losing streak (against some admittedly strong competition). Yet, Dartmouth pulled off one of the biggest upsets of the season, dropping Princeton -- ranked ninth in the media poll and eighth in the coaches poll going into the game -- in impressive fashion: Down 7-5 at the half, the Big Green used a three-goal run over the final 6:43 of the third quarter and the first 5:49 of the fourth quarter to draw even with the Tigers at eight; then, after falling behind 8-9 following a Jake Froccaro goal with just over seven minutes remaining in regulation, Dartmouth ripped off two goals in the latter stages of the final period to pull out the improbable victory (what would be its third and final victory of the season).

The winning goal was scored by freshman Cam Lee.
Laxpower ranked the Dartmouth win over Princeton as the 4th biggest upset of the 2013 season.

Brendan Callahan era
Brendan Callahan became the new head coach at Dartmouth in August 2014, replacing former head coach Andy Towers. The Big Green were 5-8 (1-5 in the Ivy League) in his first season in 2015.

The season was highlighted by the double overtime victory over Ivy League rival Harvard, 12-11, on March 21, 2015. Freshman Jack Korzelius scored the winning overtime goal in that game. Captain Philip Hession (First Team All-Ivy, USILA Scholar All-American) had a dominant game at the face-off X winning 20 of 24 draws and scooping 15 groundballs. Laxpower ranked the Dartmouth win over Harvard as the 2nd biggest upset in the 2015 season. Two Big Green players finished in the Division I top 10 statistically for 2015: Adam Fishman, attack, finished third in shooting percentage (.481), and Hession, a midfielder, finished sixth in groundballs per game (7.77) as well as ninth in face-off percentage (0.625).

In 2016, 2017, and 2018, the Big Green had a combined 5–35 record, going winless in all 18 Ivy League contests. The hiring of new offensive coordinator Joe Conner in the summer of 2018 represents a new chapter in the Brendan Callahan era.

Season Results
The following is a list of Dartmouth's results by season as an NCAA Division I program:

{| class="wikitable"

|- align="center"

†NCAA canceled 2020 collegiate activities due to the COVID-19 virus.

References

External links

Archival images of early Dartmouth lacrosse practices

 
Lacrosse teams in New Hampshire
1926 establishments in New Hampshire
Lacrosse clubs established in 1926